The 2011 US Open was a tennis tournament played on the outdoor hard courts at the Billie Jean King National Tennis Center in Flushing Meadows Park, of Queens, New York City, United States. It began on 29 August and was originally scheduled to end on 11 September, but the men's final was postponed to 12 September due to rain.

Rafael Nadal and Kim Clijsters were the defending champions. Due to an abdominal muscle injury, Clijsters opted not to defend her title.

In the women's singles, Australia's Samantha Stosur defeated Serena Williams in straight sets 6–2, 6–3 for her first Grand Slam title. Stosur thus became the first Australian female player to win a Grand Slam since Evonne Goolagong Cawley in 1980.

In the men's singles, both Nadal and Novak Djokovic played the final for the second consecutive year. This time, Djokovic won 6–2, 6–4, 6–7(3–7), 6–1 for his first US Open title.

Points and prize money

Point distribution
Below is a series of tables for each of the competitions showing the ranking points on offer for each event.

Seniors points

Junior points

Wheelchair points

Prize money
The USTA announced that the 2011 US Open purse has increased by more than one million dollars to reach a record $23.7 million. In addition to the base purse of $23.7 million, the top three men's and top three women's finishers in the Olympus US Open Series may earn up to an additional $2.6 million in bonus prize money at the US Open, providing a potential total payout of $26.3 million. Both the men's and women's US Open singles champions will earn a record $1.8 million with the ability to earn an additional $1 million in bonus prize money (for a total $2.8 million potential payout) based on their performances in the Olympus US Open Series. Below is the list of prize money given to each player in the main draw of the professional competitions; all prize money is in US dollars (US$); doubles prize money is distributed per pair.

Bonus prize money

Singles players

Men's singles

Women's singles

Player(s) of the day
Day 1:  Madison Keys – The 16-year-old Keys defeated her compatriot and elder by 21 years, Jill Craybas on the Grandstand with a 6–2, 6–4 score in their first-round encounter, giving the Florida native her first-ever win at the US Open.
Day 2:  Simona Halep – Halep, the 19-year-old world number 53, defeated the reigning French Open champion and sixth seed Li Na at Louis Armstrong Stadium with a 6–2, 7–5 score in their first round encounter.
Day 3:  Julien Benneteau – The French wild-card upset tenth-seeded Spaniard Nicolás Almagro in straight sets.
Day 4:  Juan Carlos Ferrero – The unseeded Ferrero, an experienced ATP Tour player and the second oldest man in the draw at 31 years old, defeated seventh-seeded Gaël Monfils in an extraordinary five-set match to advance into the third round.
Day 5:  Flavia Pennetta – The twenty-sixth seed, two-time quarterfinalist, and former world number 10 upset third seed, 2006 US Open champion, and former world number 1 Maria Sharapova in three sets, 6–3, 3–6, 6–4, to advance to the fourth round.
Day 6:  Francesca Schiavone – The 31-year-old seventh seed saved a match point in her battle against world number 81 Chanelle Scheepers, and went on to win, 5–7, 7–6, 6–3, advancing to the fourth round.
Day 7:  Donald Young – The 22-year-old American wildcard upset twenty-fourth seeded veteran Juan Ignacio Chela in the third round in straight sets with a score of 7–5, 6–4, 6–3. He made it to the fourth round of a Grand Slam for the first time in his career after upsetting Chela and the fourteenth seeded Stanislas Wawrinka in the second round.
Day 8:  Anastasia Pavlyuchenkova – The seventeenth-seeded Russian reached her second quarterfinal this year after upsetting seventh seed Francesca Schiavone in three tight sets, 5–7, 6–3, 6–4.
Day 9: No matches completed due to rain.
Day 10: No matches completed due to rain.
Day 11:  John Isner – The twenty-eighth seeded American upset twelfth-seeded Frenchman Gilles Simon, 7–6, 3–6, 7–6, 7–6, to reach his first ever Grand Slam quarterfinal.
Day 12:  Rafael Nadal – The number two seed reached his fourth consecutive US Open semifinal after defeating American Andy Roddick in straight sets, 6–2, 6–1, 6–3, in under two hours.
Day 13:  Samantha Stosur – The number nine seed became the first Australian woman since Wendy Turnbull in 1977 to reach a US Open final, after defeating unseeded German Angelique Kerber in three sets in her semifinal match, 6–3, 2–6, 6–2.
Day 14:  Samantha Stosur – The Australian player upset the American US Open three-time champion Serena Williams in straight sets, 6–2, 6–3, winning her first Major.
Day 15:  Novak Djokovic – The Serbian player continued his amazing season by winning his first US Open and his third Grand Slam of the year, defeating the defending champion Rafael Nadal for the sixth time in 2011.

Day-by-day summaries

Events

Seniors

Men's singles

 Novak Djokovic defeated  Rafael Nadal, 6–2, 6–4, 6–7(3–7), 6–1
It was Djokovic's 10th title of the year and 28th of his career. It was his 3rd Grand Slam title of the year and 4th of his career. It was his first U.S. Open title.

Women's singles

 Samantha Stosur defeated  Serena Williams, 6–2, 6–3
It was Stosur's 1st title of the year and 3rd of her career. It was her first (and only) Grand Slam title.

Men's doubles

 Jürgen Melzer /  Philipp Petzschner defeated  Mariusz Fyrstenberg /  Marcin Matkowski, 6–2, 6–2

Women's doubles

 Liezel Huber /  Lisa Raymond defeated  Vania King /  Yaroslava Shvedova, 4–6, 7–6(7–5), 7–6(7–3)
Huber and Raymond won their first US Open title as a doubles pair.

Mixed doubles

 Melanie Oudin /  Jack Sock defeated  Gisela Dulko /  Eduardo Schwank, 7–6(7–4), 4–6, [10–8]
 Oudin and Sock became the 12th unseeded team to win a title in the history of the US Open.

Juniors

Boys' singles

 Oliver Golding defeated  Jiří Veselý, 5–7, 6–3, 6–4

Girls' singles

 Grace Min defeated  Caroline Garcia, 7–5, 7–6(7–3)

Boys' doubles

 Robin Kern /  Julian Lenz  defeated   Maxim Dubarenco /  Vladyslav Manafov, 7–5, 6–4

Girls' doubles

 Irina Khromacheva /  Demi Schuurs defeated  Gabrielle Andrews /  Taylor Townsend, 6–4, 5–7, [10–5]

Wheelchair events

Wheelchair men's singles

 Shingo Kunieda defeated  Stéphane Houdet, 3–6, 6–1, 6–0
Kunieda defended his title and won his fourth US Open title.

Wheelchair women's singles

 Esther Vergeer defeated  Aniek van Koot, 6–2, 6–1
Vergeer defended her title, extended her winning streak, and earned her sixth US Open title.

Wheelchair quad singles

 David Wagner defeated  Peter Norfolk, 7–5, 3–1 retired
Wagner defended his title and won his second US Open title.

Wheelchair men's doubles

 Stéphane Houdet /  Nicolas Peifer defeated  Maikel Scheffers /  Ronald Vink, 6–3, 6–1

Wheelchair women's doubles

 Esther Vergeer /  Sharon Walraven defeated  Jiske Griffioen /  Aniek van Koot, 7–5, 6–7(8–10), 6–4

Wheelchair quad doubles

 David Wagner /  Nick Taylor defeated  Peter Norfolk /  Noam Gershony, walkover

Singles seeds 
The following are the seeded players and notable players who withdrew from the event. Rankings are as of 22 August.

Men's singles

Withdrawals

Women's singles

Withdrawals

Wild card entries
Below are the lists of the wild card awardees entering in the main draws.

Men's singles wild card entries
  Julien Benneteau
  Robby Ginepri
  Ryan Harrison
  Steve Johnson
  Marinko Matosevic
  Bobby Reynolds
  Jack Sock
  Donald Young

Women's singles wild card entries
  Jill Craybas
  Lauren Davis
  Casey Dellacqua
  Jamie Hampton
  Madison Keys
  Aravane Rezaï
  Alison Riske
  Sloane Stephens

Men's doubles wild card entries
  Jeff Dadamo /  Austin Krajicek
  Robby Ginepri /  Rhyne Williams
  Steve Johnson /  Denis Kudla
  Bradley Klahn /  David Martin
  Travis Parrott /  Bobby Reynolds
  Jack Sock /  Jackson Withrow

Women's doubles wild card entries
  Hilary Barte /  Mallory Burdette
  Samantha Crawford /  Madison Keys
  Lauren Davis /  Nicole Gibbs
  Alexa Glatch /  Jamie Hampton
  Melanie Oudin /  Ahsha Rolle
  Jessica Pegula /  Taylor Townsend
  Alison Riske /  Sloane Stephens

Mixed doubles wild card entries
  Irina Falconi /  Steve Johnson
  Christina Fusano /  David Martin
  Raquel Kops-Jones /  Rajeev Ram
  Melanie Oudin /  Jack Sock (champions)
  Abigail Spears /  Travis Parrott
  Taylor Townsend /  Donald Young
  CoCo Vandeweghe /  Eric Butorac
  Mashona Washington /  Michael Russell

Protected ranking
The following players were accepted directly into the main draw using a protected ranking: 

Men's Singles
  Fernando González
  Tommy Haas
  Ivo Karlović

Women's Singles
  Alona Bondarenko
  Serena Williams

Qualifiers entries

Men's singles qualifiers entries

  João Souza
  Jean-René Lisnard
  Marsel İlhan
  Jesse Huta Galung
  Sergei Bubka
  Augustin Gensse
  Louk Sorensen
  Vasek Pospisil
  Go Soeda
  Malek Jaziri
  Conor Niland
  Robert Farah
  Romain Jouan
  Frank Dancevic
  Jonathan Dasnières de Veigy
  Michael Yani

The following players received entry from a lucky loser spot:
  Lukáš Lacko
  Rogério Dutra da Silva

Women's singles qualifiers entries

  Galina Voskoboeva
  Marina Erakovic
  Sílvia Soler Espinosa
  Romina Oprandi
  Réka Luca Jani
  Alexandra Panova
  Stéphanie Foretz Gacon
  Urszula Radwańska
  Michaëlla Krajicek
  Noppawan Lertcheewakarn
  Laura Robson
  Vitalia Diatchenko
  Chan Yung-jan
  Ekaterina Bychkova
  Karin Knapp
  Aleksandra Wozniak

Withdrawn players
The following players were accepted directly into the main tournament, but withdrew with injuries.

Men's Singles
  Jérémy Chardy → replaced by  Horacio Zeballos
  Pablo Cuevas → replaced by  Flavio Cipolla
  Łukasz Kubot → replaced by  Lukáš Lacko
  Sam Querrey → replaced by  Michael Russell
  Milos Raonic → replaced by  Tatsuma Ito
  Tommy Robredo → replaced by  Thiemo de Bakker
  Robin Söderling → replaced by  Rogério Dutra da Silva

Women's Singles
  Timea Bacsinszky → replaced by  Misaki Doi
  Anna Chakvetadze → replaced by  Anastasia Rodionova
  Kim Clijsters → replaced by  Nuria Llagostera Vives
  Lourdes Domínguez Lino → replaced by  Mona Barthel
  Alisa Kleybanova → replaced by  Heather Watson
  Dinara Safina → replaced by  Eleni Daniilidou

References

External links

 Official website of US Open

 
 

 
2011
US Open
US Open
US Open
US Open
US Open
US Open
US Open